The Merced Grove Ranger Station in Yosemite National Park was designed by the National Park Service and completed in 1935.  An example of the National Park Service Rustic style, it features log construction. The station is near the Merced Grove of giant sequoias, in the Crane Flat region of the park.

The building consists of a living room, bedroom, and kitchen. Outside and up a hill to the north of the cabin is 2 small outhouses. The structure was employed for a time as a summer retreat for Yosemite park superintendents.

References

External links

National Park Service ranger stations
Park buildings and structures on the National Register of Historic Places in California
National Register of Historic Places in Mariposa County, California
National Register of Historic Places in Yosemite National Park
Residential buildings on the National Register of Historic Places in California
Residential buildings completed in 1935
Rustic architecture in California
1935 establishments in California